Urriðafoss ("sea trout waterfall") is a waterfall located in the river Þjórsá in southwest Iceland. With a flow rate of 360 m³/s, it has the highest average water flow of any waterfall in Iceland, and the second highest in Europe behind the Rheinfall.

The Fossafélagið Títan company was given permission in 1927 to build a power plant in Urriðafoss in connection with a railway to Reykjavík from the waterfall.
It did not happen but now Landsvirkjun is planning to build hydropower stations on the lower part of Þjórsár river, at Urriðafoss and Núpur.

The proposed Urriðafoss Power Plant is expected to have a capacity of approximately 125 MW and a power-generating capacity of  930 GWh per year. The waterfall is expected to disappear if the powerhouse is built. Local residents in the area are protesting against the construction in an effort to save Urriðafoss.

See also
List of waterfalls by flow rate

References

External links

 Nýjar virkjanir í Þjórsá - English summary
 Map of proposed power plant in Urriðafoss
 Faults and fractures of the South Iceland Seismic Zone near Þjórsá

Waterfalls of Iceland